Bankura Hindu High School is one of the oldest schools in Bankura District, West Bengal, India.  This school, popularly known as Hindu School, was founded in 1894. The main language of instruction is Bengali.

History

Affiliation
This school is affiliated to West Bengal Board of Secondary Education & West Bengal Board of Secondary Education

References

See also
Bankura Zilla School
Purulia Zilla School
Shyampur High School

High schools and secondary schools in West Bengal
Schools in Bankura district
Educational institutions established in 1894
1894 establishments in India